The 1953–54 1re série season was the 33rd season of the 1re série, the top level of ice hockey in France. Chamonix Hockey Club won their 14th league title.

Final ranking
 1st place: Chamonix Hockey Club
 2nd place: Paris Université Club
 3rd place: CSG Paris
 4th place: Diables Rouges de Briançon
 5th place: Ours de Villard-de-Lans
 6th place: Radio Tout Sport

External links
List of French champions on hockeyarchives.info

Fra
1953–54 in French ice hockey
Ligue Magnus seasons